Gwotet is an album by David Murray released on the Justin Time label. Recorded in 2003 and released in 2004 the album features performances by Murray and the Gwo-Ka Masters with Pharoah Sanders. It is Murray's second album with the Gwo-Ka Masters following Yonn-Dé (2002).

Reception

Reviewing for The Village Voice in September 2004, Tom Hull called Gwotet "a foray into pan-African cosmopolitanism" and "a nonstop riot of rhythm and horns".

The Allmusic review by Scott Yanow awarded the album 4 stars stating "Freed from playing jazz standards or very free improvisations, Murray really thrives in this exotic setting . . . 'Gwotet,' 'Ouagadougou,' and 'Djolla Feeling' are high points, but there are no slow moments during the infectious set of danceable but somewhat unclassifiable music."

Track listing
 "Gwotet" (Kiavue, Laviso, Murray) -  12:14  
 "O' Léonso" (Traditional) -  7:57  
 "Ouagadougou" - 12:30  
 "La Jwa" - 10:04  
 "Djolla Feeling" (Sambe) - 9:24  
 "Go to Jazz" (Kiavue, Murray) - 4:26  
 "Ovwa" (Kiavue, Traditional) - 5:34  
 "Gwotet [Radio Edit]" (Kiavue, Laviso, Murray) - 6:22  
All compositions by David Murray except as indicated  
Recorded October 2003

Personnel
David Murray - tenor saxophone
Leonardo Alarcon - trombone
Angel Ballester Veliz - alto saxophone and flute
Alexander Brown - trumpet
Elpidio Chappotin Delgado - trumpet
Hamid Drake - drums
Klod Kiavue - gwo ka drums and voice
Christian Laviso - guitar and voice
Moises Marquez Leyva - baritone saxophone
Hervé Sambe - guitar
Pharoah Sanders - tenor saxophone
Jaribu Shahid - bass
Carlos Sonduy Dimet - trumpet

References

2003 albums
David Murray (saxophonist) albums